The Otuzco Province is one of twelve provinces of the La Libertad Region in Peru. The capital of this province is the city of Otuzco.

Political division
The province is divided into ten districts, which are:

 Otuzco
 Agallpampa
 Charat
 Huaranchal
 La Cuesta
 Mache
 Paranday
 Salpo
 Sinsicap
 Usquil

Provinces of the La Libertad Region